The 1930 Pittsburgh Pirates season was the 49th season of the Pittsburgh Pirates franchise; the 44th in the National League. The Pirates finished fifth in the league standings with a record of 80–74.

Regular season

Season standings

Record vs. opponents

Game log

|- bgcolor="ccffcc"
| 1 || April 15 || @ Reds || 7–6 || Swetonic (1–0) || Lucas || — || 30,112 || 1–0
|- bgcolor="ffbbbb"
| 2 || April 16 || @ Reds || 1–3 || Donohue || Brame (0–1) || — || 4,412 || 1–1
|- bgcolor="ccffcc"
| 3 || April 17 || @ Reds || 7–1 || French (1–0) || Rixey || — || — || 2–1
|- bgcolor="ccffcc"
| 4 || April 18 || @ Reds || 5–3 || Petty (1–0) || May || Swetonic (1) || — || 3–1
|- bgcolor="ccffcc"
| 5 || April 19 || @ Cardinals || 5–4 (10) || Kremer (1–0) || Sherdel || — || — || 4–1
|- bgcolor="ccffcc"
| 6 || April 21 || @ Cardinals || 6–4 || Brame (1–1) || Hill || — || — || 5–1
|- bgcolor="ccffcc"
| 7 || April 25 || Cardinals || 6–1 || Kremer (2–0) || Sherdel || — || — || 6–1
|- bgcolor="ccffcc"
| 8 || April 26 || Cardinals || 9–7 || Brame (2–1) || Hallahan || — || — || 7–1
|- bgcolor="ccffcc"
| 9 || April 27 || @ Cubs || 9–5 || French (2–0) || Bush || Swetonic (2) || — || 8–1
|- bgcolor="ffbbbb"
| 10 || April 28 || @ Cubs || 4–7 || Root || Spencer (0–1) || — || — || 8–2
|- bgcolor="ccffcc"
| 11 || April 29 || @ Cubs || 13–9 || Erickson (1–0) || Blake || Swetonic (3) || — || 9–2
|- bgcolor="ffbbbb"
| 12 || April 30 || @ Cubs || 2–5 || Malone || Jones (0–1) || — || — || 9–3
|-

|- bgcolor="ffbbbb"
| 13 || May 1 || Braves || 3–4 || Seibold || French (2–1) || — || — || 9–4
|- bgcolor="ccffcc"
| 14 || May 2 || Braves || 3–2 || Kremer (3–0) || Cantwell || Petty (1) || — || 10–4
|- bgcolor="ffbbbb"
| 15 || May 3 || Braves || 7–12 || Cunningham || Swetonic (1–1) || — || — || 10–5
|- bgcolor="ffbbbb"
| 16 || May 5 || Giants || 1–9 || Walker || French (2–2) || — || 5,000 || 10–6
|- bgcolor="ffbbbb"
| 17 || May 6 || Giants || 9–11 || Hubbell || Kremer (3–1) || Heving || — || 10–7
|- bgcolor="ccffcc"
| 18 || May 7 || Giants || 16–8 || Swetonic (2–1) || Parmelee || — || — || 11–7
|- bgcolor="ffbbbb"
| 19 || May 8 || Giants || 10–13 (10) || Walker || French (2–3) || — || — || 11–8
|- bgcolor="ffbbbb"
| 20 || May 9 || Robins || 4–7 || Clark || Petty (1–1) || Dudley || — || 11–9
|- bgcolor="ffbbbb"
| 21 || May 10 || Robins || 0–7 || Elliott || Kremer (3–2) || — || 11,000 || 11–10
|- bgcolor="ffbbbb"
| 22 || May 11 || @ Robins || 2–10 || Vance || French (2–4) || — || 26,000 || 11–11
|- bgcolor="ccffcc"
| 23 || May 12 || Robins || 6–2 || Brame (3–1) || Dudley || — || 2,000 || 12–11
|- bgcolor="ffbbbb"
| 24 || May 13 || Phillies || 8–14 || Benge || Petty (1–2) || — || — || 12–12
|- bgcolor="ccffcc"
| 25 || May 17 || Reds || 7–5 || Kremer (4–2) || Donohue || Swetonic (4) || — || 13–12
|- bgcolor="ccffcc"
| 26 || May 18 || @ Reds || 2–1 || Brame (4–1) || Frey || — || — || 14–12
|- bgcolor="ccffcc"
| 27 || May 20 || @ Reds || 5–0 || French (3–4) || Lucas || — || — || 15–12
|- bgcolor="ccffcc"
| 28 || May 21 || Cubs || 10–3 || Kremer (5–2) || Teachout || Meine (1) || — || 16–12
|- bgcolor="ffbbbb"
| 29 || May 22 || Cubs || 5–12 || Osborn || Petty (1–3) || Moss || — || 16–13
|- bgcolor="ccffcc"
| 30 || May 23 || Cubs || 7–6 || Meine (1–0) || Carlson || Spencer (1) || — || 17–13
|- bgcolor="ffbbbb"
| 31 || May 24 || Cubs || 3–5 || Malone || French (3–5) || — || — || 17–14
|- bgcolor="ccffcc"
| 32 || May 25 || @ Reds || 6–5 (10) || Spencer (1–1) || Kolp || — || — || 18–14
|- bgcolor="ffbbbb"
| 33 || May 25 || @ Reds || 3–4 || Lucas || Chagnon (0–1) || — || — || 18–15
|- bgcolor="ffbbbb"
| 34 || May 26 || Cardinals || 4–10 || Sherdel || Petty (1–4) || Lindsey || — || 18–16
|- bgcolor="ccffcc"
| 35 || May 27 || Cardinals || 8–5 || French (4–5) || Grabowski || — || — || 19–16
|- bgcolor="ffbbbb"
| 36 || May 30 || Reds || 1–9 || Lucas || Chagnon (0–2) || — || — || 19–17
|- bgcolor="ccffcc"
| 37 || May 30 || Reds || 7–6 || Kremer (6–2) || Benton || Spencer (2) || — || 20–17
|- bgcolor="ffbbbb"
| 38 || May 31 || Reds || 4–10 || Rixey || French (4–6) || Kolp || — || 20–18
|-

|- bgcolor="ffbbbb"
| 39 || June 1 || @ Cubs || 4–16 || Bush || Meine (1–1) || — || — || 20–19
|- bgcolor="ffbbbb"
| 40 || June 3 || @ Robins || 5–6 || Clark || Spencer (1–2) || — || 18,000 || 20–20
|- bgcolor="ccffcc"
| 41 || June 4 || @ Robins || 12–6 || French (5–6) || Dudley || — || — || 21–20
|- bgcolor="ffbbbb"
| 42 || June 5 || @ Robins || 5–6 || Elliott || Petty (1–5) || Luque || — || 21–21
|- bgcolor="ccffcc"
| 43 || June 6 || @ Braves || 4–3 || Meine (2–1) || Cantwell || — || — || 22–21
|- bgcolor="ffbbbb"
| 44 || June 7 || @ Braves || 4–6 || Zachary || Kremer (6–3) || — || — || 22–22
|- bgcolor="ffbbbb"
| 45 || June 8 || @ Braves || 6–10 || Seibold || French (5–7) || — || — || 22–23
|- bgcolor="ffbbbb"
| 46 || June 11 || @ Giants || 2–9 || Hubbell || Meine (2–2) || — || — || 22–24
|- bgcolor="ccffcc"
| 47 || June 12 || @ Giants || 10–7 || Kremer (7–3) || Fitzsimmons || — || — || 23–24
|- bgcolor="ffbbbb"
| 48 || June 13 || @ Giants || 2–7 || Walker || French (5–8) || — || — || 23–25
|- bgcolor="ccffcc"
| 49 || June 14 || @ Phillies || 19–12 || Spencer (2–2) || Smythe || — || — || 24–25
|- bgcolor="ffbbbb"
| 50 || June 14 || @ Phillies || 4–5 || Collins || Petty (1–6) || — || — || 24–26
|- bgcolor="ffbbbb"
| 51 || June 16 || @ Phillies || 14–18 || Collard || Kremer (7–4) || Collins || — || 24–27
|- bgcolor="ffbbbb"
| 52 || June 17 || @ Phillies || 4–5 (10) || Nichols || French (5–9) || — || — || 24–28
|- bgcolor="ffbbbb"
| 53 || June 18 || Giants || 3–4 || Walker || Meine (2–3) || Pruett || — || 24–29
|- bgcolor="ccffcc"
| 54 || June 20 || Giants || 8–4 || Kremer (8–4) || Fitzsimmons || — || — || 25–29
|- bgcolor="ffbbbb"
| 55 || June 21 || Giants || 5–6 (10) || Donohue || Spencer (2–3) || — || — || 25–30
|- bgcolor="ffbbbb"
| 56 || June 22 || @ Robins || 6–9 || Luque || French (5–10) || — || — || 25–31
|- bgcolor="ffbbbb"
| 57 || June 23 || Robins || 6–19 || Elliott || Meine (2–4) || — || — || 25–32
|- bgcolor="ccffcc"
| 58 || June 25 || Robins || 5–1 || Kremer (9–4) || Dudley || — || — || 26–32
|- bgcolor="ccffcc"
| 59 || June 26 || Phillies || 1–0 || French (6–10) || Collins || — || — || 27–32
|- bgcolor="ccffcc"
| 60 || June 26 || Phillies || 11–5 || Brame (5–1) || Collard || — || 4,000 || 28–32
|- bgcolor="ccffcc"
| 61 || June 27 || Phillies || 6–4 || Meine (3–4) || Willoughby || — || — || 29–32
|- bgcolor="ccffcc"
| 62 || June 28 || Phillies || 6–3 || Spencer (3–3) || Nichols || — || 12,000 || 30–32
|- bgcolor="ffbbbb"
| 63 || June 28 || Phillies || 4–6 || Benge || Chagnon (0–3) || — || 12,000 || 30–33
|- bgcolor="ffbbbb"
| 64 || June 30 || Braves || 5–6 || Cantwell || Kremer (9–5) || Seibold || 2,000 || 30–34
|-

|- bgcolor="ccffcc"
| 65 || July 1 || Braves || 8–3 || French (7–10) || Brandt || — || — || 31–34
|- bgcolor="ffbbbb"
| 66 || July 2 || Braves || 4–6 || Seibold || Brame (5–2) || — || — || 31–35
|- bgcolor="ffbbbb"
| 67 || July 3 || Braves || 0–8 || Smith || Spencer (3–4) || — || — || 31–36
|- bgcolor="ffbbbb"
| 68 || July 4 || Cubs || 1–10 || Teachout || Meine (3–5) || — || 12,000 || 31–37
|- bgcolor="ccffcc"
| 69 || July 4 || Cubs || 5–1 || Kremer (10–5) || Root || — || 14,000 || 32–37
|- bgcolor="ffbbbb"
| 70 || July 5 || Cubs || 3–12 || Osborn || French (7–11) || — || — || 32–38
|- bgcolor="ffbbbb"
| 71 || July 6 || @ Cardinals || 1–2 || Haines || Spencer (3–5) || — || — || 32–39
|- bgcolor="ffbbbb"
| 72 || July 6 || @ Cardinals || 4–12 || Grimes || Brame (5–3) || — || — || 32–40
|- bgcolor="ccffcc"
| 73 || July 7 || @ Cardinals || 9–5 || French (8–11) || Haid || — || — || 33–40
|- bgcolor="ccffcc"
| 74 || July 8 || @ Cardinals || 10–5 || Kremer (11–5) || Rhem || — || — || 34–40
|- bgcolor="ffbbbb"
| 75 || July 9 || @ Cardinals || 6–7 || Haid || Meine (3–6) || — || — || 34–41
|- bgcolor="ccffcc"
| 76 || July 11 || Cardinals || 6–2 || Brame (6–3) || Hallahan || — || — || 35–41
|- bgcolor="ccffcc"
| 77 || July 12 || Cardinals || 3–2 || Kremer (12–5) || Haines || — || — || 36–41
|- bgcolor="ccffcc"
| 78 || July 13 || @ Robins || 1–0 || French (9–11) || Elliott || — || 18,000 || 37–41
|- bgcolor="ffbbbb"
| 79 || July 14 || @ Robins || 8–12 || Vance || Spencer (3–6) || — || — || 37–42
|- bgcolor="ffbbbb"
| 80 || July 15 || @ Robins || 0–5 || Clark || Brame (6–4) || — || — || 37–43
|- bgcolor="ffbbbb"
| 81 || July 16 || @ Braves || 3–4 || Zachary || Kremer (12–6) || — || — || 37–44
|- bgcolor="ccffcc"
| 82 || July 16 || @ Braves || 9–5 || Meine (4–6) || Sherdel || — || — || 38–44
|- bgcolor="ccffcc"
| 83 || July 17 || @ Braves || 6–2 || French (10–11) || Cantwell || — || — || 39–44
|- bgcolor="ccffcc"
| 84 || July 18 || @ Braves || 12–4 || Spencer (4–6) || Seibold || — || — || 40–44
|- bgcolor="ccffcc"
| 85 || July 19 || @ Braves || 9–4 || Brame (7–4) || Smith || — || — || 41–44
|- bgcolor="ffbbbb"
| 86 || July 21 || @ Phillies || 2–7 || Sweetland || Kremer (12–7) || — || — || 41–45
|- bgcolor="ffbbbb"
| 87 || July 22 || @ Phillies || 5–11 || Collins || French (10–12) || — || — || 41–46
|- bgcolor="ccffcc"
| 88 || July 23 || @ Phillies || 2–1 || Meine (5–6) || Hansen || — || — || 42–46
|- bgcolor="ccffcc"
| 89 || July 23 || @ Phillies || 16–15 (13) || French (11–12) || Sweetland || — || — || 43–46
|- bgcolor="ffbbbb"
| 90 || July 24 || @ Giants || 0–1 (7) || Hubbell || Kremer (12–8) || — || — || 43–47
|- bgcolor="ffbbbb"
| 91 || July 25 || @ Giants || 1–3 || Mitchell || French (11–13) || — || — || 43–48
|- bgcolor="ffbbbb"
| 92 || July 26 || @ Giants || 4–10 || Fitzsimmons || Brame (7–5) || — || — || 43–49
|- bgcolor="ccffcc"
| 93 || July 27 || @ Giants || 10–8 || Meine (6–6) || Walker || Swetonic (5) || — || 44–49
|- bgcolor="ccffcc"
| 94 || July 27 || @ Giants || 8–4 || Spencer (5–6) || Donohue || — || — || 45–49
|- bgcolor="ccffcc"
| 95 || July 29 || Cardinals || 6–5 || Kremer (13–8) || Grabowski || — || — || 46–49
|- bgcolor="ccffcc"
| 96 || July 30 || Cardinals || 6–5 || Brame (8–5) || Haines || — || 3,000 || 47–49
|- bgcolor="ccffcc"
| 97 || July 31 || Cardinals || 4–3 || French (12–13) || Lindsey || — || — || 48–49
|-

|- bgcolor="ffbbbb"
| 98 || August 1 || @ Cubs || 7–10 || Osborn || Spencer (5–7) || — || 30,000 || 48–50
|- bgcolor="ccffcc"
| 99 || August 2 || @ Cubs || 14–8 || Kremer (14–8) || Bush || — || — || 49–50
|- bgcolor="ccffcc"
| 100 || August 3 || @ Cubs || 12–8 || Brame (9–5) || Root || — || — || 50–50
|- bgcolor="ffbbbb"
| 101 || August 6 || Robins || 4–7 || Thurston || French (12–14) || Heimach || — || 50–51
|- bgcolor="ffbbbb"
| 102 || August 7 || Robins || 4–6 || Vance || Spencer (5–8) || Clark || — || 50–52
|- bgcolor="ffbbbb"
| 103 || August 8 || Giants || 1–9 || Walker || Meine (6–7) || — || — || 50–53
|- bgcolor="ffbbbb"
| 104 || August 8 || Giants || 2–7 || Hubbell || Brame (9–6) || — || 11,000 || 50–54
|- bgcolor="ffbbbb"
| 105 || August 9 || Giants || 6–10 || Pruett || Kremer (14–9) || — || 7,000 || 50–55
|- bgcolor="ccffcc"
| 106 || August 11 || Giants || 8–5 || French (13–14) || Chaplin || — || — || 51–55
|- bgcolor="ccffcc"
| 107 || August 12 || Phillies || 8–7 (14) || Swetonic (3–1) || Elliott || — || — || 52–55
|- bgcolor="ccffcc"
| 108 || August 12 || Phillies || 8–3 || Spencer (6–8) || Sweetland || — || 5,000 || 53–55
|- bgcolor="ccffcc"
| 109 || August 13 || Phillies || 8–4 || Kremer (15–9) || Collard || — || — || 54–55
|- bgcolor="ffbbbb"
| 110 || August 15 || Phillies || 5–7 || Collins || Meine (6–8) || — || — || 54–56
|- bgcolor="ccffcc"
| 111 || August 15 || Phillies || 3–2 (10) || Swetonic (4–1) || Sweetland || — || — || 55–56
|- bgcolor="ffbbbb"
| 112 || August 16 || Robins || 5–7 || Moss || Wood (0–1) || Clark || — || 55–57
|- bgcolor="ccffcc"
| 113 || August 16 || Robins || 6–2 || Kremer (16–9) || Thurston || — || — || 56–57
|- bgcolor="ffbbbb"
| 114 || August 17 || @ Robins || 0–5 || Vance || French (13–15) || — || 18,000 || 56–58
|- bgcolor="ccffcc"
| 115 || August 18 || Robins || 4–3 || Brame (10–6) || Clark || — || — || 57–58
|- bgcolor="ccffcc"
| 116 || August 19 || Robins || 8–0 || Swetonic (5–1) || Phelps || — || — || 58–58
|- bgcolor="ccffcc"
| 117 || August 20 || Braves || 5–0 || Kremer (17–9) || Seibold || — || — || 59–58
|- bgcolor="ccffcc"
| 118 || August 22 || Braves || 10–3 || French (14–15) || Zachary || — || — || 60–58
|- bgcolor="ccffcc"
| 119 || August 23 || Braves || 5–0 || Wood (1–1) || Smith || — || — || 61–58
|- bgcolor="ccffcc"
| 120 || August 23 || Braves || 2–1 || Brame (11–6) || Cantwell || — || — || 62–58
|- bgcolor="ccffcc"
| 121 || August 24 || @ Reds || 9–6 || Kremer (18–9) || Frey || — || — || 63–58
|- bgcolor="ffbbbb"
| 122 || August 24 || @ Reds || 0–2 || Kolp || Swetonic (5–2) || — || 9,000 || 63–59
|- bgcolor="ffbbbb"
| 123 || August 26 || @ Cubs || 5–7 || Blake || French (14–16) || — || 25,000 || 63–60
|- bgcolor="ccffcc"
| 124 || August 27 || @ Cubs || 10–8 || Brame (12–6) || Root || — || — || 64–60
|- bgcolor="ccffcc"
| 125 || August 28 || Reds || 16–12 || Kremer (19–9) || Lucas || Spencer (3) || — || 65–60
|- bgcolor="ccffcc"
| 126 || August 28 || Reds || 11–2 || Swetonic (6–2) || Frey || — || — || 66–60
|- bgcolor="ccffcc"
| 127 || August 30 || Reds || 5–0 || Wood (2–1) || Kolp || — || — || 67–60
|- bgcolor="ccffcc"
| 128 || August 30 || Reds || 3–2 || French (15–16) || Benton || — || — || 68–60
|- bgcolor="ffbbbb"
| 129 || August 31 || @ Reds || 1–4 || Rixey || Brame (12–7) || — || — || 68–61
|-

|- bgcolor="ffbbbb"
| 130 || September 1 || Cardinals || 6–11 || Rhem || Swetonic (6–3) || — || 8,000 || 68–62
|- bgcolor="ffbbbb"
| 131 || September 1 || Cardinals || 1–5 || Grimes || Kremer (19–10) || — || 12,000 || 68–63
|- bgcolor="ccffcc"
| 132 || September 3 || Cubs || 9–6 || Spencer (7–8) || Blake || Swetonic (6) || 5,000 || 69–63
|- bgcolor="ffbbbb"
| 133 || September 4 || Cubs || 7–10 (10) || Petty || Swetonic (6–4) || Malone || — || 69–64
|- bgcolor="ccffcc"
| 134 || September 5 || Cubs || 8–7 || Brame (13–7) || Osborn || — || — || 70–64
|- bgcolor="ffbbbb"
| 135 || September 6 || Cubs || 14–19 || Bush || Swetonic (6–5) || Petty || — || 70–65
|- bgcolor="ccffcc"
| 136 || September 7 || @ Cubs || 9–7 || Brame (14–7) || Bush || — || 35,000 || 71–65
|- bgcolor="ffbbbb"
| 137 || September 10 || @ Braves || 0–5 || Zachary || Kremer (19–11) || — || — || 71–66
|- bgcolor="ccffcc"
| 138 || September 11 || @ Braves || 5–2 || Brame (15–7) || Sherdel || — || — || 72–66
|- bgcolor="ffbbbb"
| 139 || September 12 || @ Braves || 4–5 (10) || Frankhouse || French (15–17) || — || — || 72–67
|- bgcolor="ccffcc"
| 140 || September 14 || @ Giants || 8–6 (10) || Spencer (8–8) || Heving || — || — || 73–67
|- bgcolor="ccffcc"
| 141 || September 14 || @ Giants || 7–3 (7) || Wood (3–1) || Walker || French (1) || 30,000 || 74–67
|- bgcolor="ffbbbb"
| 142 || September 15 || @ Giants || 1–6 || Fitzsimmons || Swetonic (6–6) || — || 3,000 || 74–68
|- bgcolor="ffbbbb"
| 143 || September 16 || @ Phillies || 14–15 (10) || Collins || Wood (3–2) || — || — || 74–69
|- bgcolor="ccffcc"
| 144 || September 17 || @ Phillies || 12–5 || Brame (16–7) || Collard || — || — || 75–69
|- bgcolor="ccffcc"
| 145 || September 18 || @ Phillies || 6–5 || Kremer (20–11) || Milligan || — || — || 76–69
|- bgcolor="ccffcc"
| 146 || September 20 || @ Robins || 6–2 || French (16–17) || Elliott || Spencer (4) || — || 77–69
|- bgcolor="ccffcc"
| 147 || September 21 || @ Robins || 7–6 || Brame (17–7) || Clark || — || — || 78–69
|- bgcolor="ffbbbb"
| 148 || September 23 || Reds || 0–8 || May || Spencer (8–9) || — || — || 78–70
|- bgcolor="ffbbbb"
| 149 || September 23 || Reds || 2–5 || Ash || Wood (3–3) || — || — || 78–71
|- bgcolor="ccffcc"
| 150 || September 24 || Reds || 5–1 (6) || French (17–17) || Carroll || — || — || 79–71
|- bgcolor="ffbbbb"
| 151 || September 25 || @ Cardinals || 0–9 || Grimes || Kremer (20–12) || — || 20,000 || 79–72
|- bgcolor="ffbbbb"
| 152 || September 26 || @ Cardinals || 5–10 || Haines || Brame (17–8) || — || 10,000 || 79–73
|- bgcolor="ccffcc"
| 153 || September 27 || @ Cardinals || 11–8 || Wood (4–3) || Kaufmann || — || — || 80–73
|- bgcolor="ffbbbb"
| 154 || September 28 || @ Cardinals || 1–3 || Dean || French (17–18) || — || — || 80–74
|-

|-
| Legend:       = Win       = LossBold = Pirates team member

Opening Day lineup 
Brickell-CF
Grantham-2B
Waner-RF
Comorosky-LF
Suhr-1B
Bartell-SS
Hemsley-C
Engle-3B
Kremer-P

Roster

Player stats

Batting

Starters by position 
Note: Pos = Position; G = Games played; AB = At bats; H = Hits; Avg. = Batting average; HR = Home runs; RBI = Runs batted in

Other batters 
Note: G = Games played; AB = At bats; H = Hits; Avg. = Batting average; HR = Home runs; RBI = Runs batted in

Pitching

Starting pitchers 
Note: G = Games pitched; IP = Innings pitched; W = Wins; L = Losses; ERA = Earned run average; SO = Strikeouts

Other pitchers 
Note: G = Games pitched; IP = Innings pitched; W = Wins; L = Losses; ERA = Earned run average; SO = Strikeouts

Relief pitchers 
Note: G = Games pitched; W = Wins; L = Losses; SV = Saves; ERA = Earned run average; SO = Strikeouts

Farm system

LEAGUE CHAMPIONS: Wichita Aviators

References 

 1930 Pittsburgh Pirates team page at Baseball Reference
 1930 Pittsburgh Pirates Page at Baseball Almanac

Pittsburgh Pirates seasons
Pittsburgh Pirates season
Pittsburg Pir